The Horace Hatch House is a historic house in Winchester, Massachusetts.  Originally located on Lloyd Street, this c. 1835 Greek Revival cottage was moved to its present location on Grove Street c. 1843.  It is a locally rare example of a side gable Greek Revival cottage whose roof overhangs its full-width front porch.  The house is similar to the nearby Hovey-Winn House, and may have been built by the same housewright, John Coats.

The house was listed on the National Register of Historic Places in 1989.

See also
National Register of Historic Places listings in Winchester, Massachusetts

References

Houses on the National Register of Historic Places in Winchester, Massachusetts
Houses in Winchester, Massachusetts